Devon is an unincorporated community in Mingo County, West Virginia, United States.

References

Unincorporated communities in Mingo County, West Virginia
Unincorporated communities in West Virginia